Krydseren was a Norwegian satirical magazine published between 1849 and 1855.

History and profile
Krydseren was established in 1849 by Ditmar Meidell, and published by Christian Schibsted. It is regarded as the first satirical magazine in Norway. The magazine was first published monthly and then, began to be published weekly.

Krydseren became defunct in 1855 when it was turned into the newspaper Aftenbladet.

References

1849 establishments in Norway
1854 disestablishments in Norway
Defunct magazines published in Norway
Magazines established in 1849
Magazines disestablished in 1854
Magazines published in Oslo
Monthly magazines published in Norway
Satirical magazines published in Norway
Weekly magazines published in Norway